The O.D. Gunn Trade and Sale Barn is a historic commercial agricultural building at 10 Anna Street in Quitman, Arkansas.  It is a rectangular wood-frame structure with a monitor gabled roof.  Its exterior is clad in metal sheathing scored to resemble brick.  The roof has exposed rafter ends, and heavy Craftsman style brackets at the front-facing gable end.  It was built about 1910 by Offie Dorris Gunn, who used it to deal in horses and mules.  It is a particularly well-preserved barn of the type used for this purpose in the early 20th century.

The building was listed on the National Register of Historic Places in 2016.

See also
National Register of Historic Places listings in Cleburne County, Arkansas

References

Commercial buildings on the National Register of Historic Places in Arkansas
Buildings and structures in Cleburne County, Arkansas